The gens Durmia was a plebeian family at ancient Rome.  It is known chiefly from a single individual, Marcus Durmius, a triumvir monetalis under Augustus.  He minted several coins, including one bearing the head of Augustus on the obverse, and a boar on the reverse; another with a lion feeding upon a stag; and a third with a youthful head and a quadriga, with the inscription , probably referring to the games of Virtus and Honor celebrated by Augustus.

See also
 List of Roman gentes

References

Roman gentes